The NRL Schoolboy Cup is the premier secondary schools rugby league competition in Australia, held annually since 1975. Formerly known under such names as the Amco Shield, Commonwealth Bank Cup, Arrive Alive Cup and GIO Schoolboy Cup nearly 450 schools from throughout Australia compete in the knock-out competition.

The player of the tournament is awarded the Peter Sterling Medal, renamed in 1996 after Peter Sterling, who won the medal in 1978. The competition is televised on Fox Sports.

The most successful school is St Gregory's College, Campbelltown, with nine titles, while the most recent champions are Kirwan State High School, who won their second title in 2019.

History
The competition started in 1975 as the Amco Shield. The inaugural winners were Patrician Brothers' College, Fairfield who defeated Blacktown High School in the final, 16–8. The match was played at Leichhardt Oval as a curtain raiser to the 1975 Amco Cup final between Eastern Suburbs and Parramatta.

Originally, the televised matches of the competition were played and recorded as the curtain raisers to mid week Amco Cup games. After the midweek competitions died out, the televised matches were played prior to Friday Night Football and were shown on Channel 9 in the weeks leading up to the NRL Grand Final. The games are currently played and recorded midweek and shown on Fox Sports, with commentary by Andrew Voss.

In 1978, Padua College, Brisbane were the first Queensland school and first school from outside of New South Wales to make the final. They lost 19–3 to Patrician Brothers' College, Fairfield.

In 1980, St Gregory's College, Campbelltown became the first school to win back-to-back titles. They later became the first school to win three titles in a row from 1989 to 1991.

In 1982 Holy Cross College, Ryde became the first school to play in four consecutive finals from 1979. They lost three of their four finals, with their only victory coming against Patrician Brothers' College, Fairfield in 1981.

In 1996, Erindale College, Canberra became the first school from the Australian Capital Territory to reach the final. A year later they became the first school from outside of New South Wales to win the competition. They won the competition again in 1998, beating Parramatta Marist High School in both years.

In 2001, Palm Beach Currumbin State High School became the first Queensland school to win the competition. Brisbane's Wavell State High School became the second a year later in 2002.

Endeavour Sports High School won the competition three years in a row from 2004 to 2006, becoming the first school to do so since 1991.

In 2015, Townsville's Kirwan State High School became the first school from North Queensland to win the competition, defeating Patrician Brothers' College, Blacktown, who were in their fourth straight final, losing the last three in a row.

In 2016, Westfields Sports High School won the competition for the first time.

In 2017, Keebra Park State High School became first Queensland school to win the competition three times, becoming the most successful school in the state. A year later, Palm Beach Currumbin won their third title, drawing level with Keebra Park. In 2019, Kirwan State High School won the competition for the second time, making it three straight years a Queensland school has won.

In 2020 and 2021,  due to the COVID-19 pandemic, no national finals were held for the first time in the competition's history.

In 2022, after a three year absence, the national final returned, with Ipswich State High School defeating Patrician Brothers' College, Fairfield to win their first title.

Naming rights
Due to sponsorship, the Schoolboy Cup has gone under many different names since first being held in 1975. Originally known as the Amco Shield, it has been known as the NRL Schoolboy Cup since 2018.
 Amco Shield (1975–1979)
 Commonwealth Bank Cup (1980–1996)
 Aussie Home Loans Cup (1997–1999)
 Nutri-Grain Cup (2000–2002)
 Arrive Alive Cup (2003–2009)
 National Schoolboy Cup (2010–2011)
 GIO Schoolboy Cup (2012–2017)
 NRL Schoolboy Cup (2018–present)

Champions

Titles

Peter Sterling Medal
The Peter Sterling Medal is awarded to the most outstanding player in the competition. Sterling, one of rugby league's most decorated players, won the award in 1978 while attending Patrician Brothers' College, Fairfield. In 1996, the medal was renamed in his honour.

See also
Australian Schoolboys rugby league team
Junior Kangaroos

References

External links
 GIO Schoolboy Cup website

Rugby league competitions in Australia
1975 in rugby league
Junior rugby league
Recurring sporting events established in 1975
1975 establishments in Australia
High school sports in Australia
National cup competitions